The 1958 USAC Championship Car season consisted of 13 races, beginning in Trenton, New Jersey on March 30 and concluding in Phoenix, Arizona on November 11. There were also five non-championship events.  The USAC National Champion was Tony Bettenhausen and the Indianapolis 500 winner was Jimmy Bryan. There were three fatalities during the season.  Pat O'Connor lost his life in a first lap accident during the Indy 500.  Art Bisch died of injuries suffered during the race at Lakewood Speedway.  Jimmy Reece was killed in a late-race incident at the second Trenton 100.

Schedule and results

 Indianapolis 500 was USAC-sanctioned and counted towards the 1958 FIA World Championship of Drivers title.
 No pole is awarded for the Pikes Peak Hill Climb, in this schedule on the pole is the driver who started first. No lap led was awarded for the Pikes Peak Hill Climb, however, a lap was awarded to the drivers that completed the climb.

Final points standings

References
 
 
 http://media.indycar.com/pdf/2011/IICS_2011_Historical_Record_Book_INT6.pdf  (p. 278-279)

See also
 1958 Indianapolis 500

USAC Championship Car season
USAC Championship Car
1958 in American motorsport